Martin “Marty” Watt (born 1952) is an American performer and actor, who played a pivotal role in the development of “performance poetry” in the early 1970s. In the late 1970s and 1980s, he moved increasingly into music and motion pictures.

Biography
Watt was born into a working-class family in the Fairmount neighborhood of Philadelphia. His father, Martin, was a civil servant, and his mother, Claire, was a housewife and semi-professional lounge singer.
He attended Frankford High School in Philadelphia, but left before graduating to pursue a career in the arts. Interested in poetry from an early age, Watt had begun composing his own poems, influenced by such authors as "...Keats, Shakespeare, and the old anonymous ballads", rather than by the Beat Generation poets so in vogue at the time.

Watt published intermittently throughout the early and mid-1970s in independent Philadelphia magazines and literary journals such as CONTACT, where his work appeared alongside that of Ted Berrigan, Tom Pickard and Otis Brown. But it was for his live performances that Watt gained wider notoriety. Initially in his native Philadelphia, but later in Washington and New York, Watt built a steady following and drew strong reviews for shows which challenged audience expectations as to what a “poetry reading” was.
Alan Kriegsman of The Washington Post said Watt “created an unclassifiable format of his own. Part recital, part sideshow, part seance. To call it a poetry reading would be like calling King Kong a nature film.”
His performances displayed an interest in stagecraft seldom seen in the conventional poetry reading- sound effects, lighting effects, specially built sets, props, costume design, as well as the occasional use of backup “singers”-all used in accompaniment to Watt's recital from memory, sometimes delivered rapidfire, other times resembling the apparent loose spontaneity of a stand-up comedian.

In Philadelphia, Watt had successful runs at Etage, the Mask and Wig Club, the Wilma Theater, and the Painted Bride, among others. In Washington D.C. he appeared at the Washington Project for the Arts in late January 1976, the three night series of performances being praised in both the Washington Post and the (now defunct) Washington Star.

As he increasingly integrated music into his performances, Watt ultimately formed a band with a number of Philadelphia musicians. Part of New York's “no wave” school, and influenced by Jamaican “dub-style” reggae vocalists, the band was fronted by Watt and included an evolving series of musicians, (among them Paul Dugan, Hank Ransome, and Chris Larkin). They performed under various names in New York and Philadelphia area venues, and recorded one never released album. The band's material was based on poems, or fragments of same, written by Watt and set to music composed by various other components of the band.

In 1982, Watt collaborated with painter and graphic artist Matt Marello on Marty Watt Is Not Matt Marello and Vice Verse (Wax Bean/Go Home Productions, 1982), a book of Watt poems illustrated by Marello.
 
In 1985, Watt starred in the motion picture Almost You, a romantic comedy set in New York. The film included the performance of one of Watt's own poems, "It Really Slits My Throat." Watt also wrote the lyrics to the film's closing credit theme "Closer to Near Than Far."

References

External links 
 Hallwalls, Buffalo N.Y. 1980
 Marty Watt at Painted Bride Philadelphia Underground Festival
 It Really Slits My Throat from Almost You
 Soundcloud poetry files

1952 births
Living people
American male film actors
No wave musicians
American performance artists
American male poets
American spoken word artists
Male actors from Philadelphia